The Anti-Slavery Day Act 2010 is an Act of the Parliament of the United Kingdom to introduce a national day to raise awareness of the need to eradicate all forms of slavery, human trafficking and exploitation. Anti-Slavery Day is 18 October.

Contents
The main provision of the Act reads as follows:

Notes

External links

United Kingdom Acts of Parliament 2010
Slavery legislation
October observances